Purdy is a small unincorporated community and census-designated place north of the city of Gig Harbor, at the junction of Washington State Routes 16 and 302 on the northern boundary of Pierce County, Washington.

It is located on the shores of Burley Lagoon and Henderson Bay, Washington of the Carr Inlet. The two bodies of water are separated by a sandspit and the Purdy Bridge, all within the Puget Sound.

The Washington Corrections Center for Women, originally named the Purdy Treatment Center, is colloquially referred to as "Purdy", though it has a Gig Harbor address.

As of the 2010 US Census, Purdy had a population of 1544.

History
Prior to white settlement, the area was inhabited by Native Americans, who fished and clammed on Henderson Bay.

In 1884, one Isaac Hawk sold  of land for $23.75. The purchaser was logger and Civil War veteran Horace Knapp (born March 23, 1845, in Titusville, Pennsylvania; died February 1, 1913, in Gig Harbor, Washington), who subdivided the land into lots and blocks to form the town of Purdy. The town's naming rights were taken by Joseph W. Purdy, a grocer from Tacoma, Washington, who had donated the materials to construct the community's first schoolhouse; the schoolhouse's land was donated by Knapp.

On February 8, 1885,  Knapp married Josephine Fuller, after which they moved to the Purdy area, making her Purdy's first white female settler. Knapp owned a floating logging camp on Burley Lagoon which included a cookhouse and bunks for the loggers.

A mill was built in 1885 by James Ashton, Joseph Purdy, William Rowland, and a Mr. Sherman on a small inlet of Burley Lagoon just down the hill from present day Peninsula High School. In 1886, the Purdy mill secured its first contract to provide huge lumber with one edge beveled for the construction of a wooden dry dock at Puget Sound Naval Shipyard in nearby Bremerton. The mill could underbid their competitors because they used an extra saw to cut the bevel, which allowed them to use only four trips of the saw carriage instead of five.

Purdy became known as a "brawling mill town". The mill's success brought such conveniences as a grocery store and a post office to the area, the latter sited on Knapp's floating camp from 1886 to 1895 after which the function transferred to Springfield (Wauna, Washington).  A long chute along present-day 144th Street brought logs down the hill to the water. The area's first Oyster factory was opened circa 1900 by a Mr Ouellette, known as "the Frenchman", to can oysters gathered from his land on the Purdy spit. Japanese oysters are still cultivated on Purdy's sandbars and in Burley Lagoon, as are clams.

The original schoolhouse was abandoned in the 1890s. In 1900, the second Purdy Schoolhouse was built to replace it on land (also donated by Knapp) located on Sherman Avenue (present-day 68th Avenue).  Students spent every other semester at either the Purdy Schoolhouse, or the Wauna Schoolhouse to keep both schools active.   The modern-day Peninsula High School now sits on the hill where one of the original schoolhouses was built. The Second schoolhouse stood until 2015, when it was demolished to build a new home.

References

 "My Father", by Earl H. Knapp

External links

Kitsap Peninsula Visitor Information - Purdy

Unincorporated communities in Pierce County, Washington
Unincorporated communities in Washington (state)